Camelford Rugby Football Club are an English and Cornish rugby union club that are based in the town of Camelford in north-east Cornwall and were founded in 2008.  They currently operate a men's team that play in Cornwall League 2 - a league that is ranked at tier 10 of the English rugby union system.

History
Camelford RFC was formed in 2008.  During the club's first two seasons they played friendly matches, mainly against Cornish opposition and in 2010 entered the Cornwall Merit Table, finishing 7th. 2011 was their first season in league rugby after being accepted to play in the Tribute Cornwall League Two. Since then they have gone from strength to strength, finishing third on both occasions during the 2013–14 and 2014-15 Cornwall 2 seasons.

Ground
Camelford plays its home games at Lane End (Tregoodwell Lane) on the outskirts of the town.  Facilities are basic, with no club-house and just the one open pitch with space for around 500 supporters standing.  Although there is no parking available at the ground, visitors can park nearby in town (five minute walk).  As Camelford has limited public transport, arriving by car is essential.

Season summary

See also

 Cornish rugby

Notes

References

External links
Camelford RFC; pitchero.com

English rugby union teams
Cornish rugby union teams
Rugby clubs established in 2008
Camelford